Ronny Løvlien (born 30 August 1971) is a Norwegian football defender.

He started his career in Langhus IL, and later played with Skeid in the Norwegian Premier League and Follo. Having helped win promotion to the First Division, he left Follo in favor of a return to Langhus. He helped this club in winning promotion to the Third Division.

His younger brother Kenneth played first-tier football too.

References

1971 births
Living people
Norwegian footballers
Skeid Fotball players
Follo FK players
People from Ski, Norway
Drøbak-Frogn IL players
Association football defenders
Sportspeople from Viken (county)